Mairuth Hodge Sarsfield, CQ (1925 – May 7, 2013) was a Canadian activist, diplomat, journalist, researcher and television personality, as well as an accomplished broadcaster, civil servant, and best-selling author.

Biography
She worked as host for the CBC, CTV, and TVOntario. For Canada's External Affairs Department, she worked on projects such as Expo 67 in Montreal and Expo '70 in Osaka, Japan, where she organized the Canadian pavilion, for the respective world Expos. As a senior information officer for the United Nations Environment Programme in Nairobi, Kenya, she developed and launched a worldwide campaign known as "For Every Child a Tree". She was also posted to Washington and New York. She returned to Canada in 1984, and served on the board of governors at the CBC.

Her novel No Crystal Stair was chosen for inclusion in Canada Reads 2005, championed by Olympic fencer Sherraine MacKay.

Mairuth was the mother of Jeremy Hodge (deceased 1979) and noted Canadian pioneering film-maker Jennifer Hodge de Silva (deceased 1989).

Awards and honours
She won numerous awards for theme coordination at World's Fair pavilions for Canada, and has been awarded with the Chevalier a L'Ordre National du Quebec in 1986, the National Congress of Black Women Foundation's First Literary Award, for No Crystal Stair, as well as 'Mairuth Sarsfield Day' by the city of Cleveland for her work with the United Nations in Nairobi.

Publications
No Crystal Stair (1997)
My Friend and I
The Fourth Wise Man

References

External links

1925 births
2013 deaths
Canadian women novelists
Canadian journalists
Writers from Montreal
Knights of the National Order of Quebec
Black Canadian writers
Black Canadian broadcasters
Activist journalists
20th-century Canadian novelists
20th-century Canadian women writers
Black Canadian women
Canadian women non-fiction writers